Königshütte Waterfall is a waterfall in the village of Königshütte in the borough of Oberharz am Brocken in the Harz Mountains of Central Germany.

The waterfall has a relatively low volume and falls through a height of 12 metres (some sources give 15 or 20 metres). The stream empties shortly thereafter into the Kalte Bode. The waterfall is man-made and was constructed in connexion with an old quarry in 1994.

The Bundesstraße 27 federal road runs close by. The area around the waterfall has been turned into a small park area. At the top of the falls at the viewing point is checkpoint no. 40 in the Harzer Wandernadel hiking network.

See also 
 Waterfalls in Germany

References 

Harz
Oberharz am Brocken
WKonigshutte
Waterfalls of Germany